Abilene Christian University's College of Arts and Sciences is the largest college of ACU with 2,000 majors with 45 undergraduate and 9 graduate degree programs in 18 academic departments.

Administration

List of deans
2007 - 2009 Dr. Jeanine Varner - Dean of the College of Arts and Sciences

Undergraduate degree programs

Agricultural and environmental sciences

Faculty
Ed Brokaw
Jim Cooke
Florah Mhlanga
Emmett Miller
Foy Mills, Jr.
Michael Nicodemus

Majors
Agribusiness
Animal Science
Environmental Science

Outstanding Alumni
Sidney Allen
Daniel Dominguez
Joseph Bunting

Art and design
Faculty & staff
Jack Mawell
Geoffrey Broderick
Robert Green
Kenney Jones
Dan McGregor
Ronnie Rama
Virginia Sadler
Nil Santana
Kathryn Wasemiller
Mike Wiggins
Sandra Willis
Majors
 Art (BA)
 Art Education (BA)
 Graphic Design/Advertising (BA)
 Graphic Design, 2- and 3-Dimensional Studio (BFA)
 Interior Design (BS)-CIDA accredited (formerly FIDER)
 Pre-Architecture (AA)

References

External links
Official website

Protestantism in Texas
Council for Christian Colleges and Universities
Universities and colleges accredited by the Southern Association of Colleges and Schools
Universities and colleges affiliated with the Churches of Christ
Private universities and colleges in Texas